Boogers Are My Beat is a book containing a collection of articles written by Pulitzer Prize winning humor columnist Dave Barry. It was originally published by Crown Publishing Group in 2003.

Collecting columns written by Barry spanning the years 1999–2002, featured sections include his coverage of the 2000 Presidential Election (particularly its Democratic and Republican National Conventions, held in Los Angeles, California and Philadelphia, Pennsylvania, respectively, that year.

Also included are two feature, non-humor columns regarding the September 11, 2001, terror attacks.  The first describes his emotions of despair and anger in the days following the disaster, with the second acting as a follow-up to the fate of United Flight 93 almost a full year following the events.

Comedy books
Works by Dave Barry
2003 non-fiction books
Works originally published in American newspapers